In September 2013, 1,400 tons of molasses spilled into Honolulu Harbor. The spill was discovered on 9 September 2013. It was caused by a faulty pipe that malfunctioned while the molasses was being loaded onto a ship, for which the shipping company Matson Navigation Co. took responsibility. Molasses is an unregulated product, and neither Matson nor government officials had a contingency plan to respond to a molasses spill. Natural currents and weather were expected to eventually dilute and flush the molasses out of the harbor and a nearby lagoon.

Divers in the harbor area reported that all sea life in the area were killed by the molasses, which instantly sank to the bottom of the harbor and caused widespread deoxygenation. Members of various coral species were injured or killed, and more than 26,000 fish and members of other marine species suffocated and died, 17,000 corals were also estimated to have been killed. One diver named Roger White was sent down into the harbor to investigate the extent of the damage caused by the Molasses and his findings were as follows, "It was shocking because the entire bottom is covered with dead fish. Small fish, crabs, mole crabs, eels. Every type of fish that you don't usually see, but now they're dead. Now they're just laying there. Every single thing is dead. We're talking in the hundreds, thousands. I didn't see one single living thing underwater".

The Hawaiian Commercial & Sugar on Maui produces molasses from fresh sugar cane, and ships it to the mainland to be processed and sold. Matson had been transporting molasses from Honolulu Harbor for 30 years and at the time was shipping it about once a week.

Aftermath 
There was never any present danger towards humans due to the Molasses, unlike in the Great Molasses Flood (or Boston Molasses Flood) which killed  21 people and injured 150 others. The danger of the Honolulu Molasses spill was caused by the effects of the molasses present in the water as it drastically increased the amount of bacterial growth due to the new abundance of sugar in the water. The other possible danger was the chance of increased predatorial activity from sharks, barracudas, and eels due to the copious amounts of deceased prey. Another potential adverse effect was the chance for unusual growth of marine algae that holds its own plethora of negative environmental impacts.

Some compare this Molasses spill to the likes of an oil spill due to the devastation to marine life and the ecosystems that both induce. The lesser of the two evils is by far Molasses spills though, the clean up process is quicker and more efficient than that of oil spills. By nature molasses is able to mix with water and due to this fact the bacteria that essentially do all the clean up are able to access the molasses more readily than in the circumstances of an oil spill where there are big clumps of oil. The other factor that aids in Molasses clean up is the number of bacteria that are able to breakdown sugar.

Follow-up
On 20 September 2013, the Hawaii Department of Transportation issued an order that all businesses which pump products through port pipelines must provide the state with documentation about pipeline inspections and spill response plans. Previously no such reporting had been required. Since such spills are almost impossible to clean up, the plan focuses on prevention and early detection, with regular inspections of pipelines and hourly monitoring of transmission operations.

In 2015 in response to the spill the EPA (Environmental Protection Agency) and Matson Navigation Co reached a $15.4 Million settlement. The settlement included $5.9 Million to regrow a coral nursery, reimburse the state for all costs of the response to the spill, and a contribution to the International Union for Conservation of Nature's World Conservation Congress. The other $9.5 Million was to cover the costs to remove the Molasses tank farm and pier risers, to safely dispose of said tank farm and pipelines, and to convert the remaining portions of pipeline for other uses rather than transporting liquids. Following this settlement and the resulting actions, this marked the end to Hawaii's sugar industry.

See also
 List of non-water floods
 Great Molasses Flood

References

Disasters in Hawaii
Environment of Hawaii
Environmental disasters in the United States
Honolulu molasses spill
Honolulu molasses spill
Honolulu molasses spill
Honolulu molasses spill
Alexander & Baldwin
Molasses
Food processing disasters